"It's a Party" is a song by American rapper Busta Rhymes featuring American R&B duo Zhané. It was released as the second single from his debut studio album The Coming. The song was written by Rhymes and Zhané-member Rene Neufville, and produced by Easy Mo Bee. Peaking at number 52 on the US Billboard Hot 100, it was a moderate success. The song was released as a double A-side single with several remixes and the album cut "Ill Vibe" featuring fellow rapper Q-Tip, which also appears on The Coming, as its B-side.

Background
After former group Leaders of the New School broke up, Rhymes had problems with recording a full album on his own. Rhymes called up A Tribe Called Quest-member and mentor Q-Tip asking for help.

"It's a Party" marks the second collaboration between Busta Rhymes and Easy Mo Bee after previously collaborating on the remix to Craig Mack's "Flava in Ya Ear" and the 1995 single "The Points".

Composition
"It's a Party" is a hip hop and R&B song, written by Rhymes and Zhané-member Rene Neufville, and produced by Easy Mo Bee. The song is composed in  time and the key of F minor, with a tempo of 178 beats per minute. It has a duration time of five minutes and fifty-three seconds.

Critical reception
Daryl McIntosh of Albumism noted that the song shows that Busta Rhymes "could entertain more than just the 'hard-knocks' at the party [and] now captur[es] the ladies' attention". He added that "the late-night gem added a new chapter to the growing legend of Busta Rhymes".

Music video
The official music video for "It's a Party" was directed by Marcus Raboy and depicts Busta Rhymes and Zhané at a party. Flipmode-members Spliff Star and Rampage make cameo appearances.

Track listing

United States 12" single

United Kingdom 12" single

United Kingdom CD single

Charts

References

1996 songs
1996 singles
Busta Rhymes songs
Zhané songs
Hip hop songs
Contemporary R&B songs
Songs written by Busta Rhymes
Music videos directed by Marcus Raboy
Elektra Records singles